Diana Sorel (born Laura Jimeno in 1946) is a Spanish actress. She starred in a number of Spanish spaghetti westerns and dramas, and is known to horror film fans for her roles in two important Spanish horror films, Los Monstruos del Terror and La llamada del vampiro.

Selected filmography
 Dollar of Fire (1966)
 The Tough One (1966)
 El Padre Manolo (1967)
 La playa de las seducciones (1967)
 S.O.S. Invasion (1969)
 Los Monstruos del Terror (1970) starring Paul Naschy
 Matalo! (1970)
 La llamada del vampiro/ Call of the Vampire (1972)
 What Am I Doing in the Middle of a Revolution? (1972)

References

Bibliography
 Thomas Weisser. Spaghetti Westerns--the Good, the Bad and the Violent: A Comprehensive, Illustrated Filmography of 558 Eurowesterns and Their Personnel, 1961–1977. McFarland, 2005.

External links

1946 births
Living people
Spanish film actresses
Spanish television actresses
People from Madrid